Space Mix '98 is the third single from the Modern Talking seventh album, Back for Good. It's a megamix. The single was not released in Germany, Austria and Switzerland, but in the other countries in Europe and the rest of the world.

Track listing 
CD Single France 1998
 "Space Mix" (feat. Eric Singleton) - 4:28
 "We Take The Chance" - 4:07
CD-Maxi Hansa 74321 63193 2 (BMG) 1998
 "Space Mix" (feat. Eric Singleton) - 4:28
 "We Take The Chance" - 4:07
 "You Can Win if You Want" (New Version) - 3:37
12" Single BMG 74321 59782-1 1998
 "Space Mix '98" - 21:55
 "Space Mix '98" (Short Version) - 4:37
 "You're My Heart, You're My Soul" (Modern Talking Mix '98 Feat. Eric Singleton) - 3:17
 "You're My Heart, You're My Soul" (Modern Talking Mix '98 Feat. Eric Singleton Extended) - 6:57

Charts

Personnel 
 Produced by Dieter Bohlen
 Coproduced by Luis Rodríguez
 Written and composed by Dieter Bohlen
 Space Mix published by Hanseatic
 The songs included in the Space Mix were published by Blue Obsession Music/Warner/Chappell Music/Intro
 We Take the Chance published by Blue Obsession Music/Warner Chappell
 Photo: Manfred Esser
 Graphic design: Ronald Reinsberg, Berlin

References

Modern Talking songs
Music medleys
1998 singles
Songs written by Dieter Bohlen